Everleigh may refer to:

Places
 Everleigh, Wiltshire, a village in England

People
 Kate Everleigh (1864–1926), Anglo-American actress

Other
 The Everleigh Club, an early 20th-century Chicago brothel owned by the sisters Ada and Minna Everleigh
 The Everleigh sisters

See also
 Eveleigh (disambiguation)
 Everly (disambiguation)